Rassokhino is a rural locality (a village) in Rezhskoye Rural Settlement, Syamzhensky District, Vologda Oblast, Russia. The population was 66 as of 2002. There are 4 streets.

Geography 
Rassokhino is located 39 km southeast of Syamzha (the district's administrative centre) by road. Gridino is the nearest rural locality.

References 

Rural localities in Syamzhensky District